The ABC islands is the physical group of Aruba, Bonaire, and Curaçao, the three westernmost islands of the Leeward Antilles in the Caribbean Sea. These have a shared political history and a status of Dutch underlying ownership, since the Anglo-Dutch Treaty of 1814 ceded them back to the Kingdom of the Netherlands, as Curaçao and Dependencies from 1815. They are a short distance north of the Falcón State, Venezuela. Aruba and Curaçao are autonomous, self governing constituent countries of the Kingdom of the Netherlands, while Bonaire is a special municipality of the Netherlands. Territories of the Kingdom of the Netherlands, the countries, and its special municipalities, are outside the European Union; citizens have Dutch nationality and the former colonial power benefits from preferential trade, mineral and natural resource rights, particularly offshore.

History 
Arawakan people such as the Caquetio are indigenous to the ABC islands. According to the disputed letters of Amerigo Vespucci, the first European to explore the ABC islands was one of Christopher Columbus' captains, Alonso de Ojeda, who landed on Curaçao in 1499. He is said to have called the islands Las islas de los Gigantes or Islands of the Giants due to the native inhabitants, the Caiquetio Indians. The first known European exploration was by Amerigo Vespucci, whose cartographer Juan de la Cosa first described the islands. By 1527 the Spanish had formed a government and established Catholicism on the islands.

In 1634, the Netherlands fought Spain over control of the islands. The Dutch won, (although Spain won them back before abandoning them due to them being of little value) and the islands were then administered by the Netherlands. The Dutch West India Company developed the areas, establishing a major port on Curaçao. The abolition of the slave trade in 1863 had a devastating impact on their economies, although the economy revived when oil was discovered in Venezuela during the early 20th century, and the islands became major oil refineries.

From 1815 until 1954 the three islands were known as the Colony of Curaçao and Dependencies. This colony at various times also included Netherlands Suriname and Sint Eustatius and Dependencies. In 1954, the ABC islands became part of the Netherlands Antilles, which gave them political autonomy within the Kingdom of the Netherlands. In 1986 Aruba withdrew from the Netherlands Antilles, becoming a separate country within the kingdom. Upon the dissolution of the Netherlands Antilles on 10 October 2010, Curaçao gained a similar status to Aruba. Bonaire became a special municipality of the Netherlands proper, although it maintains its status of an overseas territory of the European Union.

Geography and climate

The ABC islands are part of the Leeward Antilles, which is the westernmost area of the Lesser Antilles. They lie immediately to the north of Falcón State, Venezuela. Due to their political history, they are sometimes considered to be part of North America along with the other Caribbean islands, but are on South America’s geographical plate and continental shelf as with Trinidad and Tobago.

ABC does not indicate the geographical order to each other; from west to east the islands are Aruba, Curaçao, and Bonaire. Aruba is a flat island, much coastal land being exposed to tidal storm surges. Bonaire and Curaçao are surrounded by reefs, and so are much more sheltered from this. Bonaire’s and Curaçao’s reefs are popular tourist destinations.

The ABC islands have an atypical hot desert climate seen in hot pockets of Australia, Köppen climate classification BWh and BWk, with some notable rain but an excess of evaporation over precipitation. Surfaces on these islands hold little moisture and evaporate the little rainfall they receive. In addition, Aruba–Curaçao–Bonaire cactus scrub is the most common vegetation on these islands. Furthermore, the ABC islands are very dry as they lie north of the Intertropical Convergence Zone. Only in their short rainy season from October to December or January are they exposed to showers or storms formed from the northeast trade winds. The rainy season is powerfully influenced by the Southern Oscillation resulting in very high variability.

Temperatures in the ABC islands are uniformly hot, averaging around  year-round, with comfortable humidity and minima rarely falling below  even on the mildest mornings, although afternoons rarely top .

Environment 
Bonaire is known for being a "diving paradise", with ecotourism playing a large part in its economy. The islands have a huge variety of wildlife, including flamingoes and four species of sea turtle.

Demographics  
Black people make up the majorities of Curaçao and Bonaire's populations while mestizos make up the majority of Aruba's population. There has been substantial immigration from North America and Europe to the islands and to a lesser extent from South America due to a very complex immigration process.

Language 
Dutch has been the official language of the islands for most of their history. A unique Portuguese creole language has developed there known as Papiamentu. Unlike other creole languages, Papiamentu is not decreasing in usage, and was made an official language on 7 March 2007. Papiamentu is heavily influenced by Portuguese, Spanish, Dutch, English, German, French, and Italian.

Politics 
Aruba and Curaçao are autonomous countries of the Kingdom of the Netherlands, which have their own parliament and prime minister. Bonaire is a "special municipality" of the Netherlands proper, and subject to Netherlands law.

Aruba, Bonaire, and Curaçao are constitutional parts of the European Union, meaning that all three islands are special member state territories. Citizens of these islands hold European passport and can vote on European parliament elections. In addition, the islands get European development funds and students on the islands can also apply for Erasmus program from the islands. However, the islands are not in the Schengen area of the European Union.

See also 
 BES islands (Bonaire, Sint Eustatius, and Saba)
 Dutch Empire
 SSS islands (Saba, Sint Eustatius, and Sint Maarten)

References

External links 
 Infobonaire.com
 We Share Bonaire - Bonaire tourist information in photos and videos
 ABC Islands Compared - a travel essay by Attila Narin
 Map of the region
 Map of the islands
 Bonaire Times 

Leeward Antilles
Islands of the Netherlands
Islands of Aruba